Kolm is a surname. Notable people with the surname include:

Anton Kolm (1865–1922), Austrian photographer
Henry Kolm (1924–2010), American physicist
Ron Kolm (born 1947), American bookseller
Serge-Christophe Kolm (born 1932), French economist

See also
Walter Kolm-Veltée (1910–1999), Austrian film director